Charles G. Provis (1885 – date of death unknown) was an English cricketer. Provis' batting and bowling styles are unknown. He was born at Camborne, Cornwall.

Provis made two appearances in the 1906 Minor Counties Championship for Cornwall against Dorset and Berkshire. He later made a single first-class appearance when in the British Raj for the Europeans against the Indians in 1923. The Europeans won the toss and elected to bat first, making 104 all out, during which Provis was dismissed for a duck by Rama Krishnappa. In the Indians first-innings of 161 all out, Provis took the wickets of M. Venkataramanjulu and T. Bangarababu to finish with figures of 2/32 from fourteen overs. The Europeans then made 67 all out in their second-innings, with Provis again dismissed for a duck, this time by C. R. Ganapathy. The Indians won the match by ten wickets.

References

External links

1885 births
People from Camborne
English cricketers
Cornwall cricketers
Europeans cricketers
Year of death missing